This list comprises all players who have participated in at least one league match for Portland Timbers since the team's first Major League Soccer season in 2011. Players who were on the roster but never played a first team game are not listed; players who appeared for the team in other competitions (U.S. Open Cup, CONCACAF Champions League, etc.) but never actually made an MLS appearance are noted at the bottom of the page.

A "†" denotes a player who appeared in only a single match.

A
  Fanendo Adi
  Eric Alexander
  Kalif Alhassan
  Vytautas Andriuškevičius
  Victor Arboleda
  Samuel Armenteros
  Gbenga Arokoyo †
  Dairon Asprilla
  Jeff Attinella

B
  Jack Barmby
  Joe Bendik
  Sebastián Blanco
  Nat Borchers
  Kris Boyd
  Freddie Braun
  Neco Brett †
  Adin Brown
  Eric Brunner

C
  Julio Cascante
  Mike Chabala
  Diego Chará
  Steve Clark
  Tomás Conechny
  Kenny Cooper

D
  Mamadou Danso
  Claude Dielna
  Bright Dike

E
  Jeremy Ebobisse

F
  Marco Farfan
 Brian Fernández
  Gastón Fernández
  Andrés Flores
  George Fochive
  Mike Fucito

G
  Jake Gleeson
  Kevin Goldthwaite
  Ned Grabavoy
  David Guzmán

H
  Jeremy Hall
  Harold Hanson †
  Michael Harrington
  David Horst

J
  Modou Jadama †
  Andrew Jean-Baptiste
  Jeanderson
  Jack Jewsbury
  Eddie Johnson
  Ryan Johnson
  Will Johnson

K
  Pa Modou Kah
  Kosuke Kimura
  Chris Klute
  Miloš Kocić
  Adam Larsen Kwarasey

L
  Foster Langsdorf †
  Peter Lowry

M
  Larrys Mabiala
  James Marcelin
  Darren Mattocks
  Jack McInerney
  Rauwshan McKenzie
  Lucas Melano
  Roy Miller
  Ryan Miller
  Adam Moffat
  Jorge Moreira
  Hanyer Mosquera
  Danny Mwanga
  Chance Myers †

N
  Darlington Nagbe
  Michael Nanchoff

O
  Amobi Okugo
  Lawrence Olum
  Danny O'Rourke

P
  Lovel Palmer
  Norberto Paparatto
  Cristhian Paredes
  Taylor Peay
  Troy Perkins
  Jorge Perlaza
  Frédéric Piquionne
  Andy Polo
  Ryan Pore
  Alvas Powell
  Steve Purdy

R
  Brent Richards
  Donovan Ricketts
  Liam Ridgewell
  Brad Ring †

S
  Mikaël Silvestre
  Steven Smith
  Franck Songo'o

T
  Jermaine Taylor
  Steven Taylor
  Bill Tuiloma

U
  Brian Umony
  Maximiliano Urruti

V
  José Adolfo Valencia
  Zarek Valentin
  Diego Valeri
  Jorge Villafaña

W
  Rodney Wallace
  Andrew Weber

Y
  Ishmael Yartey

Z
  Steve Zakuani
  Ben Zemanski
  Sal Zizzo

Miscellaneous
  Steven Evans – Made one U.S. Open Cup appearance.
  Wade Hamilton – Made one U.S. Open Cup appearance.
  Ryan Kawulok – Made one U.S. Open Cup appearance.
  Sebastián Rincón – Made one U.S. Open Cup appearance.
  Schillo Tshuma – Made one U.S. Open Cup appearance.

See also
 All-time Portland Timbers USL roster—equivalent list for this team's second division predecessor

Sources

Portland Timbers
 
Association football player non-biographical articles